Barthel may refer to:

People
E. J. Barthel (born 1985), American football player
Ernst Barthel (1890–1953), Alsatian mathematician and philosopher, friend of Albert Schweitzer
Johann Caspar Barthel (1697–1771), German Jesuit canon lawyer
Josy Barthel (1927–1992), Luxembourgish Olympic athlete
Klaus Barthel (born 1955), German politician of the SPD
Kurt Barthel (fl. mid-20th century), founder of the American nudist movement
Marcel Barthel (born 1990), German professional wrestler
Max Barthel (1893–1975) German author
Mona Barthel (born 1990), German tennis player
Thomas Barthel (1923–1997), German ethnologist and epigrapher
Trond Barthel (born 1970), Norwegian champion pole-vaulter
Barthel Beham (1502–1540), German engraver, miniaturist, and painter
Barthel Schink (1927–1944), German youth member of the Ehrenfeld Group, an anti-Nazi resistance group

Other
Barthel, Saskatchewan, Canada
Barthel scale, a scale used to measure performance in basic activities of daily living
Lycée Technique Josy Barthel, a high school in Luxembourg
Stade Josy Barthel, a former national stadium of Luxembourg

Surnames from given names